The 18th King Edward's Own Cavalry was a regular cavalry regiment in the British Indian Army. Following the independence of India, the regiment was allotted to the Indian Army and redesignated as the 18th Cavalry.

Formation
Tracing its origins from 1842, the regiment was formed in 1921 by the amalgamation of the 6th King Edward's Own Cavalry and the 7th Hariana Lancers. These two regiments too had undergone many changes – 
1842 – Raised at Fatehgarh as 8th Regiment of Bengal Irregular Cavalry, 1861 – 6th Regiment of Bengal Cavalry, 1883 – 6th (The Prince of Wales's) Regiment of Bengal Cavalry, 1901 – 6th (Prince of Wales's) Bengal Cavalry, 1903 – 6th Prince of Wales's Cavalry, 1906 – 6th King Edward's Own Cavalry
1846– Raised at Cawnpore and Meerut as 16th Regiment of Bengal Irregular Cavalry, 1847– 17th Regiment Bengal Irregular Cavalry, 1861– 7th Regiment of Bengal Cavalry, 1900– 7th Regiment of Bengal Lancers, 1901– 7th Bengal Lancers, 1903– 7th Lancers, 1904– 7th Hariana Lancers.

The composition of the regiment at the time of amalgamation was Kaimkhanis, Rajputana Rajputs and Jats. The present class composition is of Jats from Uttar Pradesh, Haryana and Rajasthan; Rajputs from Uttar Pradesh, Madhya Pradesh and Rajasthan and Hindustani Mussalmans from all over India, but mainly from Uttar Pradesh and West Bengal.

Operations during the British Raj

Second World War 

In December 1940, during the Second World War, the regiment was mechanized. It formed part of the 3rd Indian Motor Brigade, which was initially part of the 1st Indian Armoured Division.

The brigade was detached from the division, and dispatched to Egypt along with its units including the 18th King Edward's Own Cavalry. The regiment then served in the Western Desert campaign. The regiment, and the brigade, were attached to a number of different formations that included the 2nd Armoured Division, the 7th Armoured Division, and the 9th Australian Division who they were with during the Siege of Tobruk. The regiment also supplied men for the Indian Long Range Squadron. The brigade was later overrun by the Italians during the Battle of Gazala, and took some days to reform. After the brigade reformed, the regiment was equipped as follows: Cavalry Carrier - 2 x Reconnaissance Squadron, 1 x AT Squadron.

On 30 June, the brigade was ordered to hand over 50 per cent of its vehicles to the Eighth Army, and was dispersed and the regiment was allotted to the defence of the Nile Delta and guard duties. In August, the brigade reformed and was allocated the regiment. It travelled overland to Sahneh, in Persia via Baghdad, and was placed under the command of the 31st Indian Armoured Division (formally the 1st Indian Armoured Division). In late November it then moved to Shaibah,  from Basra. From here the regiment returned to India in January 1943, and the brigade was reconstituted as the 43rd Indian Infantry Brigade (Lorried) at Shaibah at the end of January 1943. In the middle of the year, it moved to Rawalpindi and commenced conversion to a light cruiser regiment. By the end of the year, the regiment successfully converted into a light cruiser tank regiment. The regiment was split up after that, serving in different parts of India when the Japanese surrender came in August 1945.

18th King Edward's Own Cavalry won the following gallantry awards during the Second World War -
Order of the British Empire : Major L.M. Murphy
Distinguished Service Order : Major H.O.W. Fowler
Military Cross : Captain J.M. Barlow, Captain J.W. Prentice, 2nd Lieutenant G Annesley Cooke
Indian Order of Merit : Jemadar Jage Ram, Jemadar Aman Singh
Indian Distinguished Service Medal : Risaldar Hasham Ali Khan, Squadron Daffadar Major Kanshi Ram, Lance Daffadar Bajid Khan, Sowar Jit Ram, Sowar Abhe Ram, Sowar Abdi Khan, Sowar Alim Khan
Mentioned in despatches : 5

Operations in independent India

Indo-Pakistani War of 1965 
During the Indo-Pakistani War of 1965, the regiment fought a series of isolated armour battles as part of the 1st Armoured Division in the approaches to Sialkot. They left behind 29 destroyed enemy tanks and Naib Risaldar Mohd. Ayub Khan was awarded the Vir Chakra. 7 were mentioned in despatches.

Indo-Pakistani War of 1971 
During the Indo-Pakistani War of 1971, the regiment saw action in the Fazilka sector. Naib Risaldar Noor Mohammed Khan was awarded the Vir Charkra.

Other operations 
The regiment has participated in Operation Vijay, Operation Parakram and undertaken counter insurgency operations in Jammu and Kashmir, where it was awarded the GOC-in-C (Northern Command) Unit Citation.

Battle honours

The regiment was awarded the following battle honours:
Awarded to 6th King Edward's Own Cavalry
Punniar, Moodkee, Ferozeshah, Sobraon, Egypt 1882, Tel-el-Kebir, Punjab Frontier
Awarded to 7th Hariana Lancers
Punjaub, Burma 1885–87
First World War
Awarded in 1926 for services of predecessor regiments
Somme 1916, Morval, Cambrai 1917, France and Flanders 1914–18, Megiddo, Sharon, Damascus, Palestine 1918, Shaiba, Kut-al-Amara 1915, Ctesiphon, Tigris 1916, Mesopotamia 1915–16
Second World War
El Mechili, Defence of Tobruk, The Kennels, North Africa 1940–43
Independent India
Jammu and Kashmir 1965, Tilkapur-Muhadipur, Punjab 1965

President’s Standards

The President of India, Neelam Sanjiva Reddy presented a guidon to the regiment at Amritsar on 26 March 1980.
The Regiment was presented the ‘President’s Standards’ at Amritsar on 7 March 2016 by General Dalbir Singh, Chief of the Army Staff, on behalf of the President of India, Mr Pranab Mukherjee.

Equipment
The regiment shed its horses and was converted to a motorised cavalry regiment equipped with anti-tank guns in 1940. This gave way to tanks in 1943 with the introduction of the Stuart tanks. They were succeeded by the Sherman tanks in 1946, the T-54s in 1966 and finally the T-72s in 1983.

Regimental Insiginia
The Regimental insignia consists of crossed lances with pennons. Each of the pennons have scrolls with the words सत्यमेव (Satyameva) and जयते (Jayate). Satyameva Jayate translates to ‘Truth alone triumphs’. Th crossed lances are overlaid with the numeral "18" mounted by the Ashoka Lion Capital and a scroll at the base with the words ‘Cavalry’.
The motto of the regiment is साहस और सम्मान (Saahas Aur Samman), which translates to ‘Courage and honour’.

Notable personnel
Lieutenant General Gurdev Singh Kler
Major General Jagatbir Singh
Major General Gurcharan Singh Sandhu, PVSM
Brigadier Hari Singh Deora, AVSM
Risaldar Major (Hon. Captain) Mohammed Ayub Khan VrC served the regiment and was a two time member of the Lok Sabha and the Union minister of State for agriculture in the Government of India headed by P. V. Narasimha Rao.

References

Further reading

Kempton, C (1996). A Register of Titles of the Units of the H.E.I.C. & Indian Armies 1666–1947. Bristol: British Empire & Commonwealth Museum. 
Gaylor, J (1992). Sons of John Company: The Indian and Pakistan Armies 1903–1991. Stroud: Spellmount Publishers Ltd. 
Bengal Cavalry Regiments 1857–1914 By R. G. Harris, Christopher Warner. 
Gurcharan Singh Sandhu, I serve ("Ich dien"): saga of the Eighteenth Cavalry, Lancer International, 1991 (Original from the University of California) Digitized	4 Sep 2008,

External links
 The uniforms of the late 19th Century
 Evolution of the 18th Cavalry

British Indian Army cavalry regiments
Honourable East India Company regiments
Indian World War II regiments
Military units and formations established in 1842
Military units and formations established in 1921
Armoured and cavalry regiments of the Indian Army from 1947
1921 establishments in India